The Emirates Elite Panel of ICC Referees is composed of former international cricket players who are appointed by the ICC to oversee all Test match, One Day International and Twenty20 International cricket matches in the capacity of Match referee. The referees are ultimately in charge of all international cricket matches, and act as the ICC's representative at the grounds. In addition they are responsible for imposing penalties for infringements of the ICC Code of Conduct, and so being ex-international cricketers they can ensure that the punishments dealt out are just. The referees also form part of the ICC's umpire performance review, submitting reports about the umpires after each match.

Current members
As of the 10 November 2022 the ICC Elite Panel consisted of:

Past Members 
The following people were included in the inaugural panel of elite referees in 2002, but have since retired:
  Gundappa Viswanath
  Wasim Raja
  Clive Lloyd
  Mike Procter
  Alan Hurst
  Roshan Mahanama (from 2004)

Controversies

2006 ball-tampering controversy 

Mike Procter was criticised for failing to persuade umpires Darrell Hair and Billy Doctrove to continue with the match, which was awarded to England when Pakistan refused to take the field in protest at being accused of ball tampering.

2007 Cricket World Cup Final

Jeff Crowe was seen as ultimately responsible for the failure of the five match officials (himself and umpires Bucknor, Dar, Koertzen and Bowden) to adhere to the ICC's playing conditions regarding to the number of overs required before Duckworth-Lewis can determine the outcome of a match. 

This resulted in Australia and Sri Lanka having to play out three overs in near darkness, since they had been told they would otherwise have to return and play out the overs the following day. In the aftermath of this fiasco, Crowe apologised on behalf of the playing control team for the error.

Records

Tests

Most Test matches as a referee as of 10 November 2022:

ODIs

Most ODI matches as a referee as of 10 November 2022:

T20Is

Most T20I matches as a referee as of 10 November 2022:

References

See also
Umpire (cricket)
Elite Panel of ICC Umpires
International Panel of ICC Umpires

Cricket umpiring
International Cricket Council